Team Doyobi are an electronic music duo, Christopher Gladwin (b. 1976) and Alexander Peverett (b. 1976), currently signed to the Skam Records label. They began their collaboration by producing electronic soundtracks for self-made video art in the early 1990s. They performed at All Tomorrow's Parties in 2003 and 2004 and provided support for Autechre on the European leg of their 2001 tour. Their music has been described as glitchy, 8-bit (due to their early use of the Commodore Amiga personal computer), psychedelic and inspired by video games and movie soundtracks of the 1970s and 80s.

Team Doyobi are often cited as originators or godfathers of the UK chip tune scene due to their early use of obsolete computers as serious musical instruments, taking the chip sound out of the demo and video game scene and presenting it to techno–IDM audiences. Their early compositional techniques exploited the sound synthesis methods and nuances of the machines themselves and did not use their abilities as sequencers for external hardware devices.

Team Doyobi's early sound combined simple synth leads and basslines with funk, r'n'b or soul-like rhythms, overall rendering a stripped-down funky sound. Their early releases were entirely created using Commodore sound chips with no use of MIDI, synthesizers or other musical hardware. Although the technology they use has changed over recent years, their considered approach to the nuances and peculiarities of individual pieces of technology has remained consistent.

Selected discography
 Req / Team Doyobi split 12" series (FatCat Records, 1999)
 Lucky Kitchen / Team Doyobi 7" (FatCat Records, 2000)
 Push Chairs For Grown Ups, EP, CD and vinyl (Skam, 2000)
 Cryptoburners, album, CD and vinyl (Skam, 2001)
 Demons To Diamonds, vinyl single (Skam, 2001)
 DF0:BAD, vinyl EP (Skam, 2002)
 Mod Truckin' , vinyl single (Skam, 2003)
 Antiquity, vinyl EP (Skam, 2004)
 Choose Your Own Adventure, album, CD and vinyl (Skam, 2004)
 The Kphanapic Fragments, album, CD (Skam, 2006)
 Wheels Of Anterion, vinyl single (Skam, 2006)
 ORCH V, vinyl EP (Skam, 2009)
 Digital Music Volume 1, vinyl EP (Skam, 2012)
 Digital Music Volume 2, vinyl EP (Skam, 2013)

External links
[ Team Doyobi] at Allmusic
Skam Records website
Team Doyobi website
Team Doyobi Myspace
Christopher Gladwin
Alexander Peverett

References

British electronic music groups